The goal of S-estimators is to have a simple high-breakdown regression estimator, which share the flexibility and nice asymptotic properties of M-estimators. The name "S-estimators" was chosen as they are based on estimators of scale.

We will consider estimators of scale defined by a function , which satisfy

 R2 – there exists  such that  is strictly increasing on 

For any sample    of real numbers, we define the scale estimate   as the solution of

,

(If there are more solutions to the above equation, then we take the one with the smallest solution for s; if there is no solution, then we put    .)

Definition:

Let  be a sample of regression data with p-dimensional . For each vector , we obtain residuals  by solving the equation of scale above, where  satisfy R1 and R2. The S-estimator  is defined by

and the final scale estimator  is then

.

References

Estimator
Robust regression